Winona Independent School District is a school district based in Winona, Texas (USA) and covering all of the city of Winona as well as the communities of Red Springs, Sand Flat, Starrville, and East Texas Center (Owentown). In 2009, the school district was rated "academically acceptable" by the Texas Education Agency.  The rankings of the individual schools are broken down as follows:
 Exemplary: 0
 Recognized: 2
 Academically Acceptable: 2
 Academically Unacceptable: 0

For the 2003-2004 school year, the district had 987 students enrolled.

District Facts 
 Ethnic composition: African American - 18%; Hispanic - 11%; White - 71%
 2004 Tax rate: $1.57 per $100 of property valuation
 Total taxable value: $200,142,244

Schools

High schools 
 Winona High School

Middle schools 
 Winona Middle School

The Winona high school is new and improved.

See also 
 List of school districts in Texas

References

External links 
 Winona Independent School District

School districts in Smith County, Texas